The Simla Convention, officially the Convention Between Great Britain, China, and Tibet, was an ambiguous treaty concerning the status of Tibet negotiated by representatives of the Republic of China, Tibet and Great Britain in Simla in 1913 and 1914.

The Simla Convention provided that Tibet would be divided into "Outer Tibet" and "Inner Tibet". Outer Tibet, which roughly corresponded to Ü-Tsang and western Kham, would "remain in the hands of the Tibetan Government at Lhasa under Chinese suzerainty", but China would not interfere in its administration. "Inner Tibet", roughly, equivalent to Amdo and eastern Kham, would be under the jurisdiction of the Chinese government. The convention with its annexes also defines the boundary between Tibet and China proper and that between Tibet and British India (with the latter coming to be known as the McMahon Line).

A draft convention was initialled by all three countries on 27 April 1914, but China immediately repudiated it.
A slightly revised convention was signed again on 3 July 1914, but only by Britain and Tibet.  The Chinese plenipotentiary, Ivan Chen, declined to sign it. The British and Tibetan plenipotentiaries then signed a bilateral declaration that stated that the convention would be binding on themselves and that China would be denied any privileges under the convention until it signed it.

Background
Tibet was a semi-independent protectorate or vassal under indirect rule by the Qing Dynasty. which during the later crises of the Qing Dynasty, saw reduced Chinese influence, and increased British and some Russian influence as a result of the "Great Game", and other foreign influence (such as the presence of French Catholic missionaries). Britain feared increased Russian influence in Tibet, due to contacts between the Russia-born Buryat Agvan Dorzhiev and the 13th Dalai Lama. Agvan Dorzhiev claimed that Russia was a powerful Buddhist country that would ally with Tibet against China or Britain. In response, Britain sought to increase its own influence in Tibet as a buffer for British India. British forces, led by Sir Francis Younghusband, militarily intervened in Tibet in 1904 and made a treaty with the Tibetans, the 1904 Lhasa Convention. The British expedition showed the weakness of the Qing rule in Tibet, which caused the Qing to assert their influence once again. This and anti-foreign sentiment led to the Khampas to revolt in the Batang uprising, also called the 1905 Tibetan Rebellion. The Batang uprising was quelled by Qing general Feng Quan, who died in the uprising, and Zhao Erfeng, who became the Qing Dynasty's governing amban for Tibet.

In 1906, the British government sought Chinese acceptance of suzerainty over Tibet as part of the Anglo-Chinese Convention on Tibet, but was rebuffed by the Chinese envoy, who insisted on China's control over Tibetan sovereignty.  As the "Great Game" was waning with the Anglo-Russian Convention of 1907, Britain and Russia who were forming an entente, acknowledged Chinese "suzerainty" over Tibet to avoid conflict over the region.

In 1910, Qing China sent a military expedition to Tibet and came very close to taking it over, along with neighboring Himalayan kingdoms; however the Qing dynasty fell to the Xinhai Revolution the next year.

After the fall of the Qing dynasty in China, the Tibet government at Lhasa expelled all Chinese forces and declared itself independent (1913), however, this was not accepted by the newly founded Republic of China.

Conference

In 1913, the British convoked a conference at the Viceregal Lodge in Simla, India to discuss the issue of Tibet's status. The conference was attended by representatives of Britain, the newly founded Republic of China, and the Tibetan government at Lhasa.

Britain was represented Sir Henry McMahon, the Foreign Secretary of British India in Delhi. China was represented by Ivan Chen (I-fan Chen), who was the Commissioner for Trade and Foreign Affairs at Shanghai. He had previously been on the staff of the Chinese Mission in London, and served as the Taotai in the Burma–Yunan frontier. Tibet was represented by Paljor Dorje Shatra, commonly referred to as "Lonchen Shatra", who was a leading prime minister of Tibet. He was an observer during the talks for the 1893 trade regulations associated with the Convention of Calcutta, had accompanied the Dalai Lama during his exile in British India, and had considerable experience in dealing with British India.

The British and Chinese representatives had telegraphic communications with their Home governments, while the Tibetan representative only had land communications. McMahon was assisted by two political officers: Charles Alfred Bell, who negotiated with Shatra on the sidelines, and Archibald Rose, who did the same with Ivan Chen.

Conference overview 
The Simla Conference, despite its name, was held in both Simla and Delhi. (Simla was a hill station, which served as the headquarters for the Indian government during the summer months. At other times, the headquarters moved back to Delhi.) The conference held eight formal sessions.
 The first two sessions on 13 October and 18 November 1913 were held in Simla.
 The next three sessions on 12 January, 17 February and 11 March 1914 were held in Delhi.
 The last three sessions on 7 April, 27 April and 3 July 1914 were held in Simla again.
In between the formal sessions, Charles Bell and Archibald Rose negotiated with the participants bilaterally. There were also a few 'informal' tripartite sessions in addition to the formal ones.

A draft Convention, along with a map showing the boundaries, was agreed and initialled by all three participants on 27 April. But the Chinese government  repudiated it immediately. A slightly revised Convention, which took into account some Russian concerns, was signed on 3 July by Britain and Tibet, but not China. The conference left open the possibility of China joining the Convention in due course.

Initial sessions 

In the first session on 13 October, after the formalities of exchanging credentials, Lonchen Shatra presented an opening statement outlining the Tibetan position. The statement started by declaring, "Tibet and China have never been under each other and will never associate with each other in future. It is decided that Tibet is an independent state." Tibet repudiated all the previous conventions signed regarding itself without its own participation. It declared the boundaries of Tibet, ranging from the Kuenlun Range in the north, passing through the Altyn Tagh and Ho Shili ranges etc. and ending with the boundaries with Sichuan and Yunnan. (See the brown line in Map 1.) It enumerated all the districts contained within these boundaries, demanded that the revenue collected from them by China should be returned to the Tibetans, and also claimed damages for the forcible exactions carried out on them.

On 30 October, Ivan Chen made Chinese 'counter-proposals'. Beginning with a tendentious account of the relationship between the two countries, his statement claimed that the 'misunderstandings' that existed were solely due to the "conduct of His Holiness", who was said to be intractable and ignorant of the international situation. The statement declared that Tibet was  'an integral part' of China and that no attempt by Britain or Tibet to interrupt this 'territorial integrity' would be tolerated.

China however engaged not to convert Tibet into a Chinese province and Britain would likewise undertake not to annex any part of it. A Chinese Resident was to be stationed at Lhasa, and Tibet should be guided by China in its foreign and military affairs. Tibet was to grant amnesty to all the officials and non-officials who had been previously punished. Chen also presented a map marking the boundary between China and Tibet which conformed to the then prevalent Chinese notions. (See the light blue line in Map 1.)

At the second meeting, McMahon laid down that the first and most important question was the 'definition of the limits' of Tibet. Then there would be other minor issues such as the Tibetan claims of compensation for losses and the Chinese demands for amnesty. While Lonchen Shatra agreed to the procedure, Ivan Chen countered that deciding the political status of Tibet should be the first order of business. Chen also revealed that he had 'definite orders' from his government to give priority to the political questions. In response, McMahon ruled that he would discuss the frontier issue with Lonchen Shatra alone until Chen obtained authorisation from his government to join it. After five days, the Chinese government authorised Chen to join the discussion.

Frontier discussions 

Informal discussions took place throughout December, assisted by Charles Bell and Archibald Rose. Chen admitted to Rose that the frontier question was 'exploded' upon him rather unexpectedly. But Rose replied that Chen had himself pushed it to the forefront.

In the second informal meeting, Chen read out a statement, which started by arguing the Chinese position on the political status of Tibet. He maintained that China had been in effective occupation as far west as Giamda. The claim included the districts of Pomed, Zayul, Markham, Derge, Draya and Gyade, in addition to the 'generally' recognised claims to Kokonor, Batang and Litang.

The Lonchen replied that Tibet had always been 'an independent country'. At one stage a Chinese princess had been given in marriage to a Tibetan ruler and that, at another, a boundary pillar had been erected at Marugong (Kokonor–Kansu border). Even though China had given some titles to the officials in the eastern regions, the taxation and administration of the region had always been in Tibetan hands.

Chen claimed that there was a boundary pillar erected 300 li west of Batang in 1727, marking Chinese occupation. Lonchen demanded documentary proof that such a pillar had been erected. Chen was unable to produce any documentary proof other than second-hand reports.

When his turn came, the Lonchen mentioned that three identical monoliths were erected a thousand years earlier in Lhasa, the Chinese capital and the frontier, recording a Chinese–Tibetan treaty. He produced copies of the inscription on the pillars and references to it in the 'History of Tibet' compiled by the 5th Dalai Lama. The Lonchen had a mountain of evidence containing taxation and administration records for all the regions up to Tachienlu (Kangding). The Chinese had nothing comparable to offer.

In the face of the conflicting claims, both the sides agreed to prepare written statements embodying the complete evidence available on the frontier. These were presented on 12 January 1914, during the third session of the conference after it had moved to Delhi. China's extended claims were based on Zhao Erfeng's advances, which were quite recent (1906–1911). Chen justified them as 'effective occupation' recognised in international law. Lonchen ridiculed the claim, by listing the atrocities committed by Zhao and querying how the raids of such a person could be deemed lawful.

In the course of these discussions, McMahon formed the idea of distinguishing between so-called 'Inner Tibet' and 'Outer Tibet'. The main motivation, according to scholar Parshotam Mehra, was the recognition that, while the Chinese had far-flung garrisons in the frontier territories, they had been unable to affect any material change in the Tibetan administration of the tribal states. So, some kind of shared presence in these territories would be necessary. These were to form the 'Inner Tibet'. The 'Outer Tibet' was to be Lhasa's dominion, with only Chinese suzerainty over it.

McMahon's proposals 
On 17 February 1914, in the fourth session of the conference, McMahon laid on the table his proposal for the identification of 'Inner Tibet' and 'Outer Tibet' regions, along with a map showing the boundaries of these regions. (See the dashed red line and dashed blue line in Map 1.) He explained that the authentic records of both China and Tibet dating back to 822 CE had established Tibet's historical frontiers (the "red line" on the map). In the 18h century, under the Kangxi and Qianlong emperors, Chinese control was established on parts of Tibet, and boundary pillar was erected near Batang. These developments developed a "well-defined line" (the "blue line") between the sphere of "periodic Chinese intervention" and the autonomous region of Tibet where Chinese dictation was "purely nominal". These two lines now defined two zones in Tibet, for which he used the terms 'Inner Tibet' and 'Outer Tibet'.

The enunciation of the two zones marked on a map generated a strong reaction from both the Tibetan and Chinese plenipotentiaries. Lonchen argued strongly that Batang and Litang should be included in 'Outer Tibet' and adduced considerable official evidence. Ivan Chen claimed that China, under the Guangxu and Xuantong emperors, took the 'Inner Tibet' areas "back" and restored them to the Sichuan province. In the remaining areas of Tibet, he claimed that the Lhasa Amban had conducted direct administration. He clamed that his government could not recede from the claims he had made on 12 January. Frantic negotiations followed in Delhi and Beijing, and even in London. McMahon had a 'verbal statement' delivered to Chen via Archibald Rose, pointing out that in 1904 China had no administration in either zone of Tibet, adduced Fu Sung-mu's authority as evidence. He also warned the Chinese plenipotentiary that China's "uncompromising position" and renewed fighting along the China–Tibet frontier was fast eroding his own ability to persuade the Tibetans to make any concessions at all.

At the fifth session on 11 March, McMahon tabled a draft of the convention, and introduced it with a variation of his "verbal statement". He appealed to both the Tibetan and Chinese representatives for "a broad and statesmanlike spirit of compromise" so that their labours could be brought to a speedy conclusion. China was not receptive. Chen maintained that it was premature to discuss a draft since the general principles (of 'Inner' and 'Outer' Tibet) had not been accepted by his government. Meanwhile, China's amban-designate for Lhasa, sitting in Calcutta, was advising China to keep up the military pressure on the frontier and that the British were in no position to intervene militarily.

The sixth session on 7 April went by with no apparent progress. On 27 March, Chen had been warned that, if he was unable to work towards a settlement based on the map, then McMahon would have to withdraw the map and make alternative proposals. At the 7 April meeting, Chen had proposed a certain 'five-point proposal' communicated by Beijing which made promises about how China would administer the territory it claimed, but no change in the territory itself. The proposal found no favour with the other participants. At the end of the meeting, McMahon told Chen that he intended to call the next session on 14 April in order to withdraw the current draft. Chen begged for more time.

Eventually the seventh session was called on 22 April. In the interim, Chen had won some concessions. The border zone including the towns of Atuntse and Tachienlu had been conceded to China as was the lake of Kokonor. (See Map 1.) Nevertheless, on 22 April, Chen had again presented five new 'demands', which found no favour with the other participants. Lonchen also withheld consent as Derge and Nyarong were placed in Inner Tibet. At this point, McMahon made a show of withdrawing the entire draft convention, which made the other participants rethink their position. Chen begged for time to consult his governrment.

After an adjournment of five days, the draft convention, along with the map, was initialled by all three participants on 27 April 1914. Evidently, Chen initialled the draft convention reluctantly, after having been assured that initialling it did not amount to final acceptance.

April–July 1914 
During the period of April–July, prior to the final signature, Britain held discussions with Russia on the draft convention. It was obliged to do so by the Anglo-Russian Convention of 1907, as the two Great Powers had agreed to leave Tibet as a neutral zone, free of their interference.

China repudiated its plenipotentiary's act of initialling the draft convention calling it unauthorised. It also implied that Chen had been coerced to initial the convention, a charge rejected by Britain. China also charged that Henry McMahon, the British plenipotentiary, was 'unfriendly' to China and had an 'uncompromising attitude'. It requested that negotiations be continued, with the venue shifted to London or Beijing. However, London backed its plenipotentiary, declaring that "every point" in China's favour had been conceded by him as long as it caused no injustice to Tibet. For the remainder of the period, China continued to lobby for further adjustments in the boundary through the British  envoy in Beijing as well as the Chinese envoy in London. The demands were turned down by Britain. The final communication of China seemed to indicate that it would refuse to sign the convention.

The Convention
The boundary between Tibet and British India, later called the McMahon Line, was also included in the map referred to in the treaty.
This boundary was negotiated between the British and Tibetan representatives separately, in the absence of the Chinese representative.
The border decided by them was incorporated in the Simla conference map, which showed the boundary of Tibet as a "red line" and the border between Outer and Inner Tibet as a "blue line". This map was provided as an annexe to the proposed agreement and was initialled by all three representatives on 27 April 1914.

The Schedule appended to the Convention contained further notes. For example, it was to be understood that "Tibet forms part of Chinese territory" and after the Tibetans selected a Dalai Lama, the Chinese government was to be notified and the Chinese commissioner in Lhasa would "formally communicate to His Holiness the titles consistent with his dignity, which have been conferred by the Chinese Government"; that the Tibetan government appointed all officers for "Outer Tibet", and that "Outer Tibet" was not to be represented in the Chinese Parliament or any such assembly.

Negotiations failed when China and Tibet could not agree over the Sino-Tibetan boundary. The Chinese plenipotentiary, Ivan Chen, initialed the treaty, pending confirmation by his government. He was then ordered by the Chinese government to repudiate his agreement. On 3 July 1914, the British and Tibetan plenipotentiaries signed the Convention without a Chinese signature. They also signed an additional bilateral declaration with the claim that the convention would be binding on them and that China would be denied any privileges under the agreement until it signed it.
Ivan Chen left the room briefly while the British and Tibetan representatives signed the documents, and he did not have knowledge of the proceedings. He believed that the Convention itself was signed (whereas it was only initialled) and McMahon left him to retain that impression.
The British and Lonchen Shatra also signed a fresh set of trade Regulations to replace those of 1908.

Evidence indicates that the Chinese plenipotentiary viewed the Convention in favourable terms, thought it best obtainable under the circumstances, and believed that his government would accept it in due course. It is also known that he made a brave effort to convince President Yuan Shikai to accept it after his return to China.

Aftermath
The official treaty record, C.U. Aitchison's A Collection of Treaties, was published with a note stating that no binding agreement had been reached at Simla. Legal scholar M. C. van Praag states that the only mechanism for a 1914 treaty to become invalid is one of the parties repudiated it, and neither Tibet nor Britain did so.

2008 British policy change
Until 2008, the British Government's position remained the same that China held suzerainty over Tibet but not full sovereignty. It was the only state still to hold this view. David Miliband, the British Foreign Secretary, described the old position as an anachronism originating in the geopolitics of the early 20th century. Britain revised this view on 29 October 2008, when it recognised Chinese sovereignty over Tibet by issuing a statement on its website. The Economist stated that although the British Foreign Office's website does not use the word sovereignty, officials at the Foreign Office said "it means that, as far as Britain is concerned, 'Tibet is part of China. Full stop.'"

The British Government sees their new stances as an updating of their position, while some others have viewed it as a major shift in the British position. Tibetologist Robert Barnett thinks that the decision has wider implications. India's claim to a part of its north-east territories, for example, is largely based on the same agreements – notes exchanged during the Simla convention of 1914, which set the boundary between India and Tibet – that the British appear to have simply discarded. It has been speculated that Britain's shift was made in exchange for China making greater contributions to the International Monetary Fund.

Maps

See also
 Treaty of Kyakhta (1915)
 Imperialism in Asia

Notes

References

Citations

Sources 

 Aitchison, C.U. "Convention Between Great Britain, China, and Tibet, Simla", A Collection of Treaties, Engagements And Sanads, Vol XIV, Calcutta 1929, pp. 21 & 38. (Official British colonial treaty record), on the website of the Tibet Justice Center. Retrieved 2009-03-20
 
 Calvin, James Barnard (Lieutenant Commander,U. S. Navy). The China – India Border War (1962), Marine Corps Command and Staff College, April 1984, republished as The China-India Border War, globalsecurity.org. Retrieved 2009-04-11.
 
 
 
 
 
 
 
 Maxwell, Neville.  India's China War (1970) Jonathan Cape. .
 
 
 
 
 
 
 
 
 
 Staff, "Convention Between Great Britain, China, and Tibet, Simla (1914)", Tibet Justice Center. Retrieved 2009-03-20

External links 

 "Convention Between Great Britain, China, and Tibet, Simla (1914)", Tibet Justice Center . Retrieved 20 March 2009

1913 in China
1913 in India
1913 in international relations
1913 in the British Empire
1913 in Tibet
1914 in China
1914 in India
1914 in international relations
1914 in the British Empire
1914 in Tibet
Boundary treaties
British Empire
China–India border
China–Tibet relations
China–United Kingdom relations
Geography of Tibet
History of the foreign relations of India
History of Tibet
Shimla
Tibet–United Kingdom relations
Treaties concluded in 1914
Treaties extended to British India
Treaties of Sikkim
Treaties of the Republic of China (1912–1949)
Treaties of the United Kingdom (1801–1922)
Treaties of Tibet